Olivier Noel Christian Anquier (born November 11, 1959), better known as Olivier Anquier, is a French Brazilian chef, businessman and television presenter.

Personal life
Anquier was born in Paris, France. He immigrated to Brazil in 1979 and became a naturalised Brazilian citizen in late 2007. Anquier was married for 15 years to actress Débora Bloch and had two children, Julia and Hugo. He is currently married to actress Adriana Alves. In addition to his work as a television host, he is also a businessman. His latest venture is the renowned restaurant L'Entrecot do Olvier in São Paulo.

Career

As television host
Anquier commanded the cooking table in the View All programs in 2005 and 2006, coordinated by Paulo Henrique Amorim, Sunday Spectacular in 2006, 2007 and 2008 called Diário do Olivier (Olivier's Diary). Later, in 2007, he had a cooking framework at Programa da Tarde (Afternoon Programme), also in Rede Record. Had tickets for Band and continues today with the Diário do Olivier programme and the reality show, maids in Ação in the GNT.

References

1959 births
Living people
Naturalized citizens of Brazil
Brazilian chefs
French emigrants to Brazil